Eva Camacho-Sánchez is a Northampton, Massachusetts based felted decorations, jewelry, housewares, and accessories maker at her company Lana Handmade. Much of her work is inspired by nature. She grew up in Alcaudete, Spain. She sources wool from New England farmers and incorporates material from the woods into some of her work.

Eva lays out pieces of wool on a large table, wets them with water and soap, then rolls the wool in a piece of bubble wrap about 1,000 times to form it. She uses the prepared felt to make garments in about six or seven hours.

References

American jewellers
American fashion designers
Living people
American jewelry designers
Spanish emigrants to the United States
People from the Province of Jaén (Spain)
Year of birth missing (living people)
Women jewellers